Mariele Neudecker (born 1965) is a German artist who lives and works in Bristol, UK. Neudecker uses a broad range of media including sculpture, installation, film and photography. Her practice investigates the formation and historical dissemination of cultural constructs around the natural world, focusing particularly on landscape representations within the Northern European Romantic tradition and today’s notions of the Sublime. Central to the work is the human interest and relationship to landscape and its images used metaphorically for human psychology.

Neudecker has shown widely internationally, notably in Biennales in Japan, Australia and Singapore, also solo shows in Ikon Gallery, Tate St Ives and Tate Britain. In 2010 she presented a solo exhibition at Galerie Barbara Thumm, Berlin, won the Ludwig Gies Preis for her participation at Triennale Fellbach 2010 (Germany), made a new commission for Extraordinary Measures, Belsay Hall, Castle and Gardens, Newcastle upon Tyne (UK) and was invited to spend three month at the Headlands Centre for the Arts, San Francisco (USA).

She was born in Düsseldorf, Germany.

Education
1985–1987: Crawford College of Art and Design, Cork, Ireland
1987–1990: Goldsmiths’ College (BA Hons Degree), London
1991–1992: Chelsea College of Art and Design (MA Sculpture), London
1996–1997: Tower Hamlets College (Digital Image Creation/Manipulation), London

Exhibitions

Solo exhibitions

Commissions
2019: And Then the World Changed Colour: Breathing Yellow, sculptural installation, Dulwich Picture Gallery, Dulwich, South London, 2019

Group exhibitions
2015 Model, Galerie Rudolfinum, Prague

References

External links

 
"Greenland's glaciers through an artist's eyes - in pictures" at The Guardian

German artists
1965 births
Living people